Shigenobu is a Japanese name.  It is usually a male given name but can be a surname or the name of a place.  As with most personal names, the meaning of the name is derived from which kanji (Chinese characters) are used, and there are several different kanji that are pronounced "shige" and a few which can be pronounced "nobu."

Possible spellings
 重信 – "heavy faith"
 重靖 – "heavy diligence"
 重陳 – "heavy maturity"
 茂信 – "abundant faith"
 茂伸 – "abundantly influential"
 繁信 – "abundant faith"
 繫信 – "joined in faith"
 薫信 – "aroma of faith"
 滋信 – "nourishing faith"
 滋延 – "nourishing longevity"

Phonetic spelling
The following are spellings of the name "Shigenobu" in the two phonetic syllabaries of written Japanese, and thus have no intrinsic meaning:
 しげのぶ
 シゲノブ

People

Surname
, a leader of the Japanese Red Army
, the daughter of Fusako Shigenobu
, Japanese baseball player

Male
, a Japanese daimyō
, a Japanese ukiyo-e artist
, a Japanese ukiyo-e artist who may have been Ishikawa Toyonobu
, an ukiyo-e artist better known as Hiroshige II
, a Japanese statesman
, a Japanese religious leader
, a Japanese composer and music teacher
, a Japanese athlete

See also
 Shigenobu, Ehime, a town in Japan

References

Japanese-language surnames
Japanese masculine given names